Frank Monroe Upton (29 April 1896 – 25 June 1962) was a sailor in the United States Navy who received the Medal of Honor for his actions during the First World War.

Biography
Upton was born in Loveland, Colorado on 29 April 1896 and died 25 June 1962.  In 1930 Upton married Dorothy Binney Putnam, they later divorced.

He is buried in Arlington National Cemetery in Virginia (Section 8, lot 55-A).  His wife, Greta Bohmannson-Upton was buried next him, as was a relative, Paul Upton Fisher.

Medal of Honor citation
Rank and organization: Quartermaster, U.S. Navy. Born: 29 April 1896, Loveland, Colo. Accredited to: Colorado. G.O. No.: 403, 1918.

Citation:

For extraordinary heroism following internal explosion of the Florence H, on 17 April 1918. The sea in the vicinity of wreckage was covered by a mass of boxes of smokeless powder, which were repeatedly exploding. Frank M. Upton, of the U.S.S. Stewart, plunged overboard to rescue a survivor who was surrounded by powder boxes and too exhausted to help himself. Fully realizing the danger from continual explosion of similar powder boxes in the vicinity, he risked his life to save the life of this man.

See also

 List of Medal of Honor recipients for World War I

References

United States Navy Medal of Honor recipients
United States Navy sailors
Burials at Arlington National Cemetery
United States Navy personnel of World War I
People from Loveland, Colorado
1896 births
1962 deaths
World War I recipients of the Medal of Honor
Military personnel from Colorado